The Abbey Lawn in Bourne, Lincolnshire, England, is a centrally located space used as the principal recreation ground in the town.  The cricket, tennis, bowls, pétanque, and football clubs play their home fixtures here. The hockey club practices here, though it now plays its fixtures on an all-weather pitch elsewhere. "The Lawn" is the site of the Bourne Cricket Club (Lincolnshire) and its associated facilities.

Origins

Though all or most of the land once formed part of the estate of the canons of Bourne Abbey and the swimming pool originated as one of their fish ponds, the present form of the Abbey Lawn and its name derive from the 18th century development of a sheep lawn as an adjunct of the house built by George Pochin, the then lord of the manor of Bourne Abbots. His house was on the site of the claustral buildings of the monastic abbey which had been dissolved in 1536. A sheep lawn was among the gentry, the equivalent of an aristocrat's deer park.

While the part of the Abbey Church which had been used by the parish was retained, the buildings formerly used by the canons were demolished wholly or partially except where a current use could be found for them. Much of the site was therefore vacant around the period of landowner prosperity and investment which arose in relation to the agricultural enclosures of the 1766 Act of Parliament which related to most of the parish of Bourne. Pochin's house was known as 'The Abbey' so that the associated sheep lawn was known as the Abbey Lawn. The house was demolished in 1879 but the grounds remained and in the 1930s, they were developed for sports, by Bourne United Charities for the benefit of the townspeople.

References

External links

Bourne Cricket club
 Petanque
Bourne Tennis club
Bourne Soccer club
Bourne Swimming club

Sports venues in Lincolnshire
Cricket grounds in Lincolnshire
Football venues in England
Swimming venues in England
Lidos
Tennis venues in England
Bowling greens in England
Parks and open spaces in Lincolnshire
Bourne, Lincolnshire